Daniel F. O'Brien Sr. (March 26, 1929 – January 16, 2017) was an American professional baseball executive who served as the general manager of the Texas Rangers, Seattle Mariners and California Angels of Major League Baseball (MLB).

Biography
Born in Elizabeth, New Jersey, O'Brien was a graduate of Thomas Jefferson High School. He attended Seton Hall University and graduated from Florida Southern College, where he played varsity baseball and basketball. He served in the United States Army during the Korean War and was discharged in 1954.

O'Brien was a general manager in Minor League Baseball during 1955–1963 in the Pittsburgh Pirates and Milwaukee Braves organizations, then spent another nine years (1964–1972) as the chief assistant to Phil Piton and Hank Peters, presidents at the time of the National Association of Professional Baseball Leagues (NAPBL), the governing body of the minor leagues. 

O'Brien came to the major leagues when he joined the Texas Rangers as a vice president during the 1973 season, and was promoted to general manager of the Rangers later that year; he would continue in that post through 1978, although he shared power with co-general manager Eddie Robinson in both 1977 and 1978. In 1979, O'Brien became president of the Seattle Mariners, then in their third year as an American League expansion team, and he added the general manager title to his duties during 1981–1983, replacing Lou Gorman. He left Seattle in 1984 and joined the front office of the Cleveland Indians in 1986, working with Peters again as his top assistant during 1987–1989. O'Brien then moved to the California Angels as top aide to general manager Mike Port, and then succeeded Port as the team's GM from the close of the 1991 season through 1993. He was replaced by Whitey Herzog at the end of the 1993 campaign.

Of O'Brien's three major league teams, only the Rangers of the late 1970s experienced sustained success, contending for, but never winning, the American League West division title. The Mariners climbed to the middle of the pack in the AL West in 1982, then fell into the basement with 102 losses in O'Brien's last year. In Anaheim, O'Brien inherited a .500 team, but the Angels lost 90 games in 1992 and 91 games during the 1993 season.

His son and namesake, Dan O'Brien Jr., served as general manager of the Cincinnati Reds during 2003–2006. 

O'Brien died on January 16, 2017, in Dallas, Texas, at the age of 87.

References

1929 births
2017 deaths
California Angels executives
Florida Southern Moccasins baseball players
Florida Southern Moccasins men's basketball players
Major League Baseball general managers
Major League Baseball team presidents
Minor league baseball executives
Seattle Mariners executives
Seton Hall University alumni
Sportspeople from Elizabeth, New Jersey
Texas Rangers executives
Thomas Jefferson High School (New Jersey) alumni
United States Army personnel of the Korean War